The Narragansett Dawn was a monthly newspaper that discussed the history, culture and language of the Narragansett tribe. It was produced in 1935 and 1936, with a total of seventeen issues. Princess Red Wing and Ernest Hazard were the paper's founders and editors. Both were Narragansett tribal members.

The newspaper came about because of the Narragansett people's need to retain their history and cultural identity in the wake of the Indian Reorganization Act. In many of the paper's editorials, Princess Red Wing invokes the Narragansett people's pride, often in reply to claims against their ancestry and purity during their detribalization by the state of Rhode Island in the 1880s.

History
The Narragansett Dawn began publication on May 1, 1935, and continued until 1936.

Design

Name
The name The Narragansett Dawn was chosen at a tribal meeting on December 4, 1934. It was said to signify "the awakening after so long and black a night of being civilized."

Slogan and seal
The Narragansett Dawn used the slogan "We Face East" on its cover. Its meaning is broken down as follows:
We: "Every descendant of the Narragansett Tribe of Indians"
Face: "Your Creator"
East: "With the first light, each dawn"

The cover also bears the official seal of the Narragansett Indian Tribe.

Sections
Narragansett Tongue
This section contained lessons on common vocabulary, such as the names of animals, plants, and types of buildings, in the Narragansett language. There were 13 lessons in all.

Genealogy
This section traced the lineage, both paternal and maternal, of significant figures in the Narragansett community.

Narragansett Mailbox and Greetings From Friends
This section was similar to a "letter to the editor" section and contained letters written to the newspaper by its readers, both Indian and non-Indian. The letters mostly served to praise the paper or the tribe.

Identity
This section described Narragansett items and values that displayed their cultural identity. They appear with varying titles pertaining to their topic, such as "Narragansett Fires" and "Pipe of Peace."

Milestones
This section contained small bits of news, such as the announcement of births, deaths, weddings, and notable visits, that occurred in and around the Narragansett reservation in Rhode Island.

Sunrise News
This section was written for each issue by the Keeper of Records and contained information on small, notable things that had taken place in the Narragansett community in each respective month.

Poetry
The newspaper published short, original poems by Narragansett writers, often with religious or natural themes. These poems were usually related to the Narragansett tribe or their values and ideas in some way. An excerpt: "All that eye and heart could own / Rich domains to roam at will / When the morning sun went down / See him on his eastern hill" 

History
These short articles offered a Narragansett perspective on historical events such as the first Thanksgiving and King Philip's War.

Contributors
Princess Red Wing, Editor
Ernest Hazard, Editor
Marion W. Brown, Keeper of Records
Chief Pine Tree, Business Manager/Writer
Theodore Brown, Business Manager
Francis Glasko, Business Manager
Princess Wood Dove
Lone Wolf
Little Bear

References

Further reading

External links
The Narragansett Dawn, 1935-36 archive
Narragansett Indian Tribe official website

Narragansett, Rhode Island
Narragansett tribe
Native American history of Rhode Island
Native American newspapers
Publications disestablished in 1936
Publications established in 1935
1935 establishments in Rhode Island
1936 disestablishments in Rhode Island
Newspapers published in Rhode Island